Yadviga Konstantinovna Poplavskaya (born 1 May 1949) is a Soviet and Belarusian singer, member of the first ensemble Verasy and a People’s Artist of Belarus (2005).

Biography 
Born into a musical family, her father, choirmaster Konstantin Poplavsky, together with Gennady Tsitovich created Belarusian State Folk Choir.

Poplavskaya graduated from Belarusian Conservatory twice - in piano (1972) and separation of composition (1988). In 1971, she was among the founders of the Minsk-based VIA "Verasy". In the ensemble she played keyboards, sung vocals, and wrote arrangements. In 1973, Alexander Tikhanovich came to the ensemble (bass guitar, vocal, trumpet), who later became the husband of Poplavskaya.

In 1986, Poplavskaya and Tikhanovich were forced to part ways with the Verasy ensemble, and in 1987 they got into the just-organized State Orchestra of Belarus under the direction of Mikhail Finberg.

After winning the 1988 Pesnya goda with the song "Happy Occasion" (music Eduard Khanok, words Larisa Rubalskaya), Poplavskaya and Tihanovich created a duet of the same name, and later on the basis of a duet a group of the same name was formed. In the group Lucky Chance, she arranged, played keyboards and was a vocalist. The group participated in the Golden Lyre festival (Belarus), toured in Russia, Belarus, Bulgaria, Czechoslovakia, Germany, Yugoslavia, Poland, Hungary, Finland, France, Canada and Israel.

In 1988, together with her husband, she organized The Theater of Songs by Yadviga Poplavskaya and Alexander Tikhanovich, through whose studio many young Belarusian performers went through such as Alexander Solodukha, Lyapis Trubetskoy and others.

The song “Charaўnitsa” was included in the repertoire of the duet Poplavskaya and Tihanovich (as well as the “Chuk i Gek” group, the song and dance ensemble of the Armed Forces of Belarus). For the arrangement, Poplavskaya and Sergey Sukhomlin became the winners in the nomination “The Best Arranger of the Year”.

Dispute with Eduard Khanok 
Eduard Khanok declared on 28 April 2017 that his copyrights are grossly violated and, as the holder of exclusive rights, from 26 April, he forbids the performance and transmission of works from the repertoire of Poplavskaya and Tihanovich “Lucky Chance” to the words of Larisa Rubalskaya; “I live with my grandmother” in the words of Igor Shaferan; “Zavirukha” to the words of Gennady Buravkin; "Robin heard a voice" on the words of Anatoly Poperechny.

Commenting on the situation, the Poplavskaya's daughter, the singer Anastasia Tihanovich, revealed the intention of Khanok to receive for the right to perform his songs in the future $25,000 and the impossibility of paying them due to the large expenses for the treatment of her father, Alexander Tikhanovich.

Khanok also stated that he intends to sue Poplavskaya “in connection with the protection of honor, dignity and business reputation", noting that not a single Belarusian newspaper, which wrote about the funeral of Tikhanovich, mentioned its authorship “Robin”.

On 3 May 2017, Khanok refused to sue, expressing the opinion that it was enough for him to ban his songs.

On 5 July 2017, Khanok changed his decision and again shared with journalists the intention to protect his “honor, dignity and business reputation” in court, despite the fact that the ban was not violated.

Personal life

Poplavskaya was married to Alexander Tikhanovich until his death on 28 January 2017. Together, they had a daughter, Anastasia (born 1980).

Discography 
Albums with the ensemble "Verasy":
 “Our disco”
 “Music for all”

Albums of Yadviga Poplavskaya and Alexander Tikhanovich:
 “Happy Occasion” (Firm Melody, LP, 1989)
 “Music of Love” (Firm Melody; Eddy (Minsk), LP, 1995)
 "From" Robin "to ..." (Eddy. CD, 1997)
 “Life is a wonderful moment” (Master Sound, CD, 1997)
 “Love is Destiny” (West Records, 2008)

References

1949 births
Living people
People from Valozhyn District
Soviet women singers
20th-century Belarusian women singers
People's Artists of Belarus
21st-century Belarusian women singers